Daredevil/Bullseye: The Target is an unfinished limited series comic book from Marvel Comics featuring the superhero Daredevil in pursuit of his nemesis, the assassin Bullseye. The series was written by Kevin Smith with illustrations by Glenn Fabry. It is known for being quite delayed, with the first issue coming out in November 2002, and the second issue never being released.

Publication history
The first issue was released in November 2002 (and then again in February 2003 to coincide with the release of the Daredevil film) without a follow-up issue. Smith, who had become fully involved in the production of his film Jersey Girl, planned on finishing both this and another limited series, Spider-Man/Black Cat: The Evil That Men Do as soon as production on the film concluded.

However, Smith wound up not returning to either series until 2005. The final three issues of Spider-Man/Black Cat were released during November 2005 to January 2006.

In September 2005, Smith answered the controversy on the messageboard of his official website where he revealed panels from issue #2 and stated that the series would return in mid-2006. He also emphasized that the new issues would reflect the changes in Marvel continuity that had occurred in the four years between issues. Issue #2 never materialized, however, and the project appears to have been quietly dropped.

In the book Writers on Comics Scriptwriting, Smith stated that project was one he was not particularly proud of, stating that he wrote the first issue quickly so as to use Bullseye before then-current Daredevil writer Brian Michael Bendis would have a chance to use him in a story and as a result he believes he produced a product that was below satisfactory levels.

Smith later revealed that the "target" in question that Bullseye was hired to kill was Captain America.

Synopsis
It has been three years since the death of Karen Page at the hands of Bullseye (as seen in Daredevil: Guardian Devil, also written by Smith), and Matt Murdock has been preparing for the anniversary. He has pushed body and powers to their very limit with the plan of confronting Bullseye again.

But Bullseye's been busy, too. He has been honing his skills to greater levels. Now with sharper skills and a new look, he has set his sights on one of New York City's elite.

Part 1
A native New Yorker, Daredevil sits above The Pile in Manhattan reflecting resilient spirit of the citizens. He makes note of the fact that they will never forget, but they will learn to live on. He reflects on his own life, from his birth to his gaining powers to, most importantly, the death of Karen Page. After laying flowers on her grave. He foils a bank robbery by The Owl in a particularly harsh fashion, explaining that the robber is receiving the rage he wants to direct at Karen's killer: Bullseye. The memories of the murder still fresh in his mind, Daredevil destroys a punching bag with a photo of Bullseye on it.

The story then cuts to the penthouse apartment of a rich, middle-aged man named "Roger" who is in the middle of a business arrangement with two Middle Eastern men. Roger emphasizes the fact that, as "an American through and through," he abhors doing business with the two. "I love this city. I despise you people for what you did to it." The duo's country is never named and the epithets thrown at them are most likely just broad racial generalizations. However, as a professional he is willing to assist them for the right price: in this case connecting them with an assassin.

Hoping they will reconsider their mission, Roger directs the men's attention to the telescope in his living room. It is focused on a young woman breast-feeding her baby. Roger does not know the woman personally, but has been watching her apartment for over a year: she would often have a different man in her apartment every night, up until a year ago when she "started growing a belly". She has been raising the child on her own, which Roger finds touching. There's a knock on the door. Roger opens it to the assassin the men want to hire: Bullseye. (Without his usual costume, his clothes and features resemble those of his Colin Farrell likeness from the movie.)

Roger pours him a martini with an olive. Bullseye tells the two men he will kill anyone for the right price. One of them hands him a photograph (which we do not see) of someone of such importance that the assassin is taken aback. He demands $20 million for the job (10 up front, 10 upon completion). The men are intrigued, but want proof that Bullseye is as cold-blooded as he claims: they want him to kill the single mother Roger has been watching, much to Roger's horror. Without hesitation, takes the toothpick from his cocktail olive, bends it between his fingers, and flicks it through the woman's window with the speed and force of a bullet. A heart-broken Roger looks through the telescope to see the woman's body on the floor and the baby crying.

One of the men arranges to have the money delivered. The other asks Bullseye why he is not wearing his trademark costume. Bullseye explains that he gave it up as his line of work requires he draw as little attention to himself as possible. But, to humour the man, he dips his finger in his cocktail and draws a wet bullseye on his forehead.

External links
Kevin Smith's messageboard A September 2005 entry in which Smith reveals a pencil sketch of issue 2 and gives a release date.

References

2002 comics debuts
Comics by Kevin Smith
Comics set in New York City
Unfinished comics